Kerrigan v. Commissioner of Public Health, 289 Conn. 135, 957 A.2d 407, is a 2008 decision by the Connecticut Supreme Court holding that allowing same-sex couples to form same-sex unions but not marriages violates the Connecticut Constitution. It was the third time that a ruling by the highest court of a U.S. state legalized same-sex marriage, following Massachusetts in  Goodridge v. Department of Public Health (2003) and California in In re Marriage Cases (2008). The decision legalized same-sex marriage in Connecticut when it came into effect on November 12, 2008. There were no attempts made to amend the state constitution to overrule the decision, and gender-neutral marriage statutes were passed into law in 2009.

Background
Connecticut had a relatively liberal record on the question of rights for gays and lesbians. It had repealed its law criminalizing consensual sodomy in 1969, banned discrimination based on sexual orientation in 1991, and authorized second-parent adoptions in 2000.

In response to an inquiry from officials of two Connecticut towns asking whether they could issue marriage licenses to same-sex couples, Attorney General Richard Blumenthal wrote on May 17, 2004, the day that same-sex marriage became legal in Massachusetts:

Lawsuit
On August 25, 2004, Gay and Lesbian Advocates and Defenders (GLAD) filed a lawsuit, led by attorney Bennett Klein, on behalf of seven (later eight) Connecticut same-sex couples in State Superior Court, challenging the state's denial of the right to marry to same-sex couples. All had been denied marriage licenses in Madison and several were raising children. They argued that this violated the equality and liberty provisions of the Connecticut Constitution. Attorney General Blumenthal said: "The question is whether there's a denial of equal protection of the law. My job is to defend the statutes whether I like them or not, and we do that as vigorously and as zealously as we can." The Family Institute of Connecticut asked to be allowed to intervene to defend the suit, but Judge Patty Jenkins Pittman denied that request and her decision was upheld on appeal.

In October 2005, the Connecticut civil unions statute took effect. It was designed to provide same-sex couples with all the benefits and responsibilities of marriage, but it made explicit for the first time in Connecticut that marriage was the union of a man and a woman. The plaintiffs filed an amendment complaint focusing on the distinction between marriage and civil unions.

The court heard oral argument on March 21, 2006. On July 12, 2006, Judge Pittman ruled against the plaintiffs. She called the state's recent establishment of civil unions "courageous and historic". She found no meaningful distinction between marriages and civil unions except for the provision of benefits by the federal government, which did not implicate the state. She wrote:

She noted that "the plaintiffs may feel themselves to be relegated to a second class status, [but] there is nothing in
the text of the Connecticut statutes that can be read to place the plaintiffs there." She also described the court's "very limited authority to interfere with the determination of the General Assembly", i.e., the legislature, which she called "the arbiter of public policy".

Decision
The Supreme Court of Connecticut heard the appeal by the plaintiffs on May 14, 2007. Jane R. Rosenberg, representing the Attorney General, told the Court: "We're not talking about granting rights and benefits; we're talking about a word." Bennett Klein, representing the plaintiffs, called civil unions "a less prestigious, less advantageous, institution". When Klein argued that same-sex marriage was a fundamental right and guaranteed by the state constitution's ban on sex-based discrimination, Justice David M. Borden told him he was "riding two horses". Much of the argument concerned whether the Court needed to treat sexual orientation as a "suspect class", a category that would require the state to meet a higher standard for treating them as a class apart. Part of that argument addressed whether gays and lesbians can be termed "politically powerless". When Rosenberg pointed to their recent "significant advances" and suggested the trend would continue, Justice Richard N. Palmer asked: "Is that your argument—give them more time and they'll do better?" The Justices also referenced recent activity in the legislature, where a week earlier the judiciary committee had endorsed same-sex marriage by a vote of 27–15, surprising legislators who then prevailed upon the bill's sponsors to delay its consideration.

The Court issued its opinion on October 10, 2008. The Court ruled 4-3 that denying same-sex couples the right to marry, even granted them a parallel status under another name like civil unions, violated the equality and liberty provisions of the Connecticut Constitution.

Justice Richard N. Palmer wrote for the majority, joined by Justices Joette Katz, Flemming L. Norcott, Jr., and Connecticut Appellate Court Judge Lubbie Harper Jr. (who replaced the recused Chief Justice Chase T. Rogers).  The Court found a substantial difference between marriages and civil unions:

 
The ruling was scheduled to take effect on October 28. It was the first ruling by a state's highest court that found allowing same-sex couples their own marriage-like status, in this case civil unions, failing to meet the state constitution's equal protection standard. At the time, three states had civil unions (Vermont, New Hampshire and New Jersey) and four had domestic partnerships (Maine, Washington, Oregon and Hawaii).

Justices David M. Borden, Christine S. Vertefeuille, and Peter T. Zarella each field a dissent. Borden wrote that civil unions deserved more time: "Our experience with civil unions is simply too new and the views of the people of our state about it as a social institution are too much in flux to say with any certitude that the marriage statute must be struck down". Zarella found procreation a sufficient rationale for restricting marriage to different-sex couples: "The ancient definition of marriage as the union of one man and one woman has its basis in biology, not bigotry. The fact that same sex couples cannot engage in sexual conduct of a type that can result in the birth of a child is a critical difference in this context."

Governor Jodi Rell said that she would enforce the decision even though she disagreed with it. She said: "The Supreme Court has spoken. I do not believe their voice reflects the majority of the people of Connecticut. However, I am also firmly convinced that attempts to reverse this decision, either legislatively or by amending the state Constitution, will not meet with success." Peter Wolfgang, executive director of the Family Institute of Connecticut, called the judges "robed masters" and "philosopher kings". He said: "It's an outrage, but not an unexpected outrage. We have thought all along that this court would usurp democracy and impose same-sex marriage by judicial fiat." To counter the decision, he said Connecticut voters needed to support a proposal on the November 4 ballot to call a constitutional convention, which could lead to a popular vote on same-sex marriage. Voters rejected the call for a convention, with over 59% of voters voting no.

Marriages
On November 12, 2008, the first marriage licenses were issued to same-sex couples in Connecticut. Since California voters had passed a ban on same-sex marriage a few days earlier, Connecticut joined Massachusetts as the only other state licensing same-sex marriages.

In the three years between the time civil unions became available in Connecticut and the first same-sex marriages there, approximately 1,800 couples established civil unions.

In the first year that marriage license were available to them, 1,746 same-sex couples married in Connecticut.

See also 
 Baker v. Vermont, 744 A.2d 864 (Vt. 1999)
 Lewis v. Harris, 188 N.J. 415 (N.J. 2006)
 Varnum v. Brien, 763 N.W.2d 862 (Iowa 2009)
 Same-sex marriage in Connecticut

Notes

References

External links 
 Majority opinion
 Dissenting opinion by Justice Borden 
 Dissenting opinion by Justice Vertefeuille 
 Dissenting opinion by Justice Zarella 

Connecticut state case law
2008 in LGBT history
2008 in United States case law
LGBT rights in Connecticut
2008 in Connecticut
United States same-sex union case law